16 Puppis is a suspected astrometric binary star system in the southern constellation of Puppis, and is located in the northernmost part of its constellation, almost due north of the bright star Rho Puppis, and east of Canis Major. It is visible to the naked eye as a faint, blue-white hued star with an apparent visual magnitude of 4.40. The star is located is approximately 465 light years away from the Sun based on parallax. It was the brightest star in Officina Typographica, an obsolete constellation.

The visible member is a B-type main-sequence star with a stellar classification of B5 V, according to N. Houk and M. Smith-Moore (1978). Earlier, Hoffleit et al. (1964) had listed a class of B5 IV, suggesting a more evolved subgiant star. It is spinning rapidly, which is creating an equatorial bulge that is 6% larger than the polar radius. The star is radiating 836 times the luminosity of the Sun from its photosphere at an effective temperature of 16,680 K.

References

B-type main-sequence stars
B-type subgiants
Astrometric binaries
Puppis
BD-18 2190
Puppis, 16
067797
039906
3192